Vorotan may refer to:

 Vorotan (river), Armenia and Azerbaijan
 Vorotan Cascade, Armenia
 Vorotan, Goris, Armenia
 Vorotan, Sisian, Armenia
 Qubadlı or Vorotan, a town in the Republic of Artsakh